Nándor Kóródi (born 15 August 1999) is a Hungarian professional footballer who plays for Békéscsaba.

Career
On 9 January 2023, Kóródi signed with Békéscsaba.

Club statistics

Updated to games played as of 19 May 2019.

References

External links

1999 births
People from Szolnok
Sportspeople from Jász-Nagykun-Szolnok County
Living people
Hungarian footballers
Association football midfielders
Debreceni VSC players
Balmazújvárosi FC players
Szeged-Csanád Grosics Akadémia footballers
Békéscsaba 1912 Előre footballers
Nemzeti Bajnokság I players
Nemzeti Bajnokság II players